Chord may refer to:

 Chord (music), an aggregate of musical pitches sounded simultaneously
 Guitar chord a chord played on a guitar, which has a particular tuning 
 Chord (geometry), a line segment joining two points on a curve
 Chord (astronomy), a line crossing a foreground astronomical object during an occultation which gives an indication of the object's size and/or shape
 Chord (graph theory), an edge joining two nonadjacent nodes in a cycle
 Chord in truss construction – an outside member of a truss, as opposed to the inner "webbed members"
 Chord (aeronautics), the distance between the front and back of a wing, measured in the direction of the normal airflow. The term chord was selected due to the curved nature of the wing's surface
 Chord (peer-to-peer), a peer-to-peer protocol and algorithm for distributed hash tables (DHT)
 Chord (concurrency), a concurrency construct in some object-oriented programming languages
 In British railway terminology, a chord can refer to a short curve of track connecting two otherwise unconnected railway lines. 
 Andrew Chord, a comic book character who is the former mentor of the New Warriors
 Chord Overstreet, American actor and musician
 Canadian Hydrogen Observatory and Radio-transient Detector (CHORD), a proposed successor to the CHIME radio telescope
 The Chord (painting), a c.1715 painting by Antoine Watteau

Chord may also refer to:
 Mouse chording or a chorded keyboard, where multiple buttons are held down simultaneously to produce a specific action
The Chords may refer to:
 The Chords (British band), 1970s British mod revival band
 The Chords (American band), 1950s American doo-wop group

Chords may refer to:
 Chords (musician), a Swedish hiphop/reggae artist

See also 

 Animal taxonomy chordate (chordata) and eponymous notochord
 
 
 Cord (disambiguation)